PopCap Arcade Vol. 1 and PopCap Arcade Vol. 2 are retail packages of four and three Xbox Live Arcade games from PopCap Games, released exclusive in North America. The disc works by inserting it into the console just like any other game. However, rather than directly launching any of the titles, it adds four items to the Xbox Live Arcade menu with a small disc icon next to each name.

On June 3, 2010, a compilation of both volumes was released exclusively in Japan, titled PopCap Arcade: Rakushisa, Ippai, Action & Puzzle 7 Pack.

In 2011, PopCap Hits! Vol. 1 and PopCap Hits! Vol. 2 (not to be confused with the PlayStation 2 compilations with the same names) were published by Mastertronic exclusively in European regions. Compared to PopCap Arcade, Peggle replaces Zuma in the first volume; as a result, Zuma is on the second volume instead of the first, and Peggle is not on the second volume. The second volume also includes Plants vs. Zombies, which is not on either of the PopCap Arcade collections.

Games

Arcade Vol. 1

Arcade Vol. 2

Hits Vol. 1

Hits Vol. 2

See also
 Capcom Digital Collection
 Namco Museum Virtual Arcade
 Konami Classics
 Xbox Live Arcade Unplugged

References

2007 video games
2009 video games
2011 video games
PopCap games
Electronic Arts video game compilations
Video games developed in the United States
Xbox 360-only games
Xbox 360 Live Arcade games
Xbox 360 games
Xbox 360 Live Arcade compilations